Gustavo Javier Collante (born 19 May 1997) is an Argentine professional footballer who plays as a midfielder for Juan Aurich.

Career
Collante is a product of the Boca Juniors youth system. In June 2018, Collante completed a move to Primera C Metropolitana's Leandro N. Alem. However, in the succeeding August, the midfielder terminated his contract to join Deportivo Español of Primera B Metropolitana. He made his bow under manager Adrián Romero in 2018–19, appearing for his professional debut on 2 September during a 2–0 win over San Miguel. A further twenty-six appearances arrived in a campaign which concluded with relegation.

Career statistics
.

References

External links

1997 births
Living people
Sportspeople from Tucumán Province
Argentine footballers
Argentine expatriate footballers
Association football midfielders
Primera B Metropolitana players
Peruvian Segunda División players
Club Leandro N. Alem players
Deportivo Español footballers
Juan Aurich footballers
Argentine expatriate sportspeople in Peru
Expatriate footballers in Peru